The Shoalhaven Tigers are a local basketball association based on the New South Wales south coast. Teams currently compete in the New South Wales State Basketball League, Southern Junior Leagues, NSW Country Championships and Barrengarry Conference.  Despite being a small association in numbers, the Tigers have produced several players who have played NCAA, NBL and WNBL. Some of these players have also represented Australia at various junior levels and higher.

History
2008 marked the 50th anniversary of basketball in the Shoalhaven. Originally played on outdoor courts at Nowra High School and in disused aircraft hangars at HMAS Albatross, basketball has been a major sport in the region for many years. The Tigers have consistently played above expectations, and in 2007 the State League Women's team completed a perfect season winning the New South Wales State Basketball League championship 17-0.

See also

References

Basketball teams established in 1958
1958 establishments in Australia
Basketball teams in New South Wales